Pseudohyllisia is a genus of beetles in the family Cerambycidae, containing the following species:

 Pseudohyllisia bremeri Breuning, 1981
 Pseudohyllisia laosensis Breuning, 1964
 Pseudohyllisia madurensis Breuning, 1942

References

Agapanthiini